, also known as  for short, is a Japanese light novel series written by Patora Fuyuhara and illustrated by Eiji Usatsuka. It began serialization online in 2013 on the user-generated novel publishing website Shōsetsuka ni Narō until it was acquired by Hobby Japan for publishing the print edition as a light novel. J-Novel Club has licensed the series for an English release, releasing each novel in six weekly parts since February 2017. A manga adaptation by Soto began its serialization in Kadokawa Shoten's Comp Ace in November 2016. The manga is licensed in English by Yen Press. An anime television series adaptation by Production Reed aired from July to September 2017. A second season by J.C.Staff will premiere on April 3rd 2023.

Plot
Fifteen-year-old Touya Mochizuki is accidentally killed by God. As an apology, God allows him to be resurrected, but since he cannot send him back to his old world, he instead reincarnates him into a fantasy world along with any special requests. Touya requested to bring his smartphone into the new world with him, which God modifies. As such, while Touya cannot contact his old world with it, the phone can be easily recharged by magic and can otherwise function such as accessing data from the old world and can use relevant features for his new world such as the GPS function to locations which are comprehensively identified on it.

God also greatly amplifies Touya's physical, magical, and cognitive abilities to a certain degree as a further apology for the inconvenience of killing him. Taking full advantage of his second chance at life, Touya befriends many different people, mainly women and high-ranking people in the new world. He begins to travel from country to country, solving political disputes, minor quests, and nonchalantly enjoying himself with his newfound allies.

Characters

Brunhild Duchy

A fifteen-year-old from Earth, reborn by god into the other world as a way of apology for the latter's mistake of killing him. His smartphone is his only remaining connection to Earth; while he can no longer call anyone from his old life, he can still access the Internet, and the battery can be recharged with magical energy. He is bestowed with all seven attributes of magic: Fire, Water, Wind, Earth, Light, Dark, and Null. He regularly gets mistaken to be from Eashen (a country resembling Feudal Japan), sharing the same back-to-front name system. He begins as a simple adventurer in the Kingdom of Belfast, though due to his granted skills and humble nature he quickly rises in fame through impulsive acts. After discovering the first Babylon "Aerial Garden" and having a mock conversation with Professor Regina Babylon, he sets out to find the rest of the Babylons in order to defeat the Phrase. According to Babylon's vision, Touya would have nine wives in total. He gradually forms pacts with all four of the Heavenly Beasts, with the first and most loyal being Kohaku, the White Monarch. He also eventually becomes a duke and a king of the Brunhild Dukedom after helping to smooth out relations between the Regulus Empire and the Belfast Kingdom. He is also the first silver rank adventurer to appear in 18 years, and later, upon achieving gold rank, becomes one of only two living "heroes" in the world. Later on, he is a demi-god on his way to becoming a full god due to his body being rebuilt in the divine realm by the God of Worlds.

The elder sister of the Silhoueska twins, a pair of wandering adventurers, and with her natural impulsiveness as a fighter by profession. She has long hair and a smaller chest than her sister; feeling less feminine than Linze. Touya meets her and Linze early in his journey, rescuing them from rogues in an alleyway, and thereafter they register as adventurers in his party with the local guild. Elze fights with a pair of enchanted gauntlets and can only use the non-attributed magic 'Boost', which increases her physical abilities. During her travels, she forms affections for Touya but tries to hold them back for the sake of her sister, who also falls for him. In the end, she and Yae fight Touya in a mock battle and win, requesting to become one of his fiancées as their prize. She is Touya's third fiancée.

The younger sister of the Silhoueska twins. With her intelligence and natural talent, she is the magic specialist of the two sisters. She has short hair and larger breasts than her sister and can use three magic attributes: fire, water, and light. Touya meets her and Elze early in his journey, rescuing them from rogues in an alleyway, and thereafter they register as adventurers in his party with the local guild. Linze is the gentlest of the girls in the group, often appearing shy and easily flustered, though on the rare occasion that she is angered, Touya believes her to be the scariest of his companions. She develops feelings for Touya, but at first, cannot admit to them. Later, when Francesca registered Touya as her new master via a kiss, Linze bravely confesses her love and kisses Touya in front of the other girls. Shortly thereafter, she becomes Touya's second fiancée.

Born in the far eastern country of Eashen to a samurai family, Yae left her home to travel and hone her skills elsewhere. Touya's group crosses paths with her during their travels, helping to fend off a group of ruffians attacking her. Thereafter, she decides to accompany Touya on his travels. However, Yae is human garbage disposal; regularly putting a strain on the group's funds to compensate for her high metabolism. Eventually, she returns to Eashen alongside his group to save her father, brother, and hometown from a provincial war within the country. Throughout these events, she falls in love with Touya. In the end, she and Elze fight Touya in a mock battle. She wins, and requests to become one of his fiancées as their prize. She is Touya's fourth fiancée.

Daughter of the Duke Alfred Ernes Ortlinde, Duchess Ellen and Yumina's cousin. Sushie prefers for her friends to call her . She meets Touya's group early in the story when they rescue her from an attempted kidnapping, leading to her forming a crush on Touya. She also introduces Touya to her father, talking about how her mother has been cursed of blindness, wishing her grandfather who was a user of light magic was still alive for a cure. By sharp coincidence, Touya cures Sue's mother's eye illness, earning great honor in the Kingdom of Belfast. Due to her innocent naivety, Sue causes embarrassing moments. Later, to protect Sue from a political betrothal to a foreign fake prince suspected of pedophilia, she becomes Touya's sixth fiancée.

A Princess of Belfast, and daughter of King Tristwin and Queen Yuel. Also the niece of Duke Alfred Ernes Ortlinde and Sue's cousin. Yumina met Touya when he heals her father from attempted poisoning. Yumina possesses the Null magic "Mystic Eyes" of intuition, an ability that comes from her Heterochromic Eyes which give her the ability to see a person's true nature. Due to this power, upon seeing the selfless and kind aura surrounding Touya after he saves her father, she asks to be engaged to him, believing that she will never find a better candidate to be her husband. She is also proficient with bows and arrows, often choosing to fight alongside a pack of hunting wolves summoned with her darkness attribute. Later, when Touya becomes a duke and a king of the Brunhild Dukedom, Yumina forms the Bride Conference, a group made up of Touya's fiancées who meet, discuss and judge any additional women who fall for him to determine if they should become an official fiancée since polygamy is standard in her world. She is Touya's first fiancée.

As head of the Fairy Tribe of Mismede, Leen serves as the court mage of the Kingdom of Mismede and is capable of using her personal null magic, 'Program'. Over the span of 200 years, she has used 'Program' to create an automated teddy bear named Paula who can interact with humans, though it has yet to gain the capability to speak. She meets Touya during a diplomatic trip from Belfast when Paula brings him to her personal chambers. Intrigued by his abilities, she asks him to become her disciple; when Touya declines; she becomes Mismede's ambassador to Belfast and Brunhild Dukedom as an excuse to spend more time around him. She is the one to start Touya on the quest for finding the ancient pieces of the lost civilization of Babylon, as she wants to gain knowledge from the "Library" of Babylon. Eventually, upon Touya's discovery of the library, she asks him to marry her. Leen becomes Touya's eighth fiancée. 

The third princess of the Regulus Empire. Touya meets Lucia when he saved the empire from being overthrown by the imperial army in a coup. He agrees to marry her after the Emperor of Regulus creates a truce with the King of Belfast, then she moves into the Brunhild Dukedom with Touya and everyone else. Lucia is a competitive person who hates losing. Her main weapon is a twin swords. She is also diligent at cooking, and has a sensitive taste bud, and has good terms with Yumina. Like Sushie she also prefers to be called by her nickname . Lucia is Touya's fifth fiancée.

Hildegard is the first princess of Lestia Knight Kingdom. She is a rather chivalrous noble person and usually wears magic-enchanted armor. She is on good terms with Yae, as the two are quite skilled in swordsmanship, and is known as "Knight Princess". Hildegard fell in love with Touya after the battle with the Phrase. Then she moves into the Brunhild Dukedom with Touya. Like Sushie and Lucia, she too prefers her nickname . She is Touya's seventh fiancée.

She is actually a potential successor of Xenoas Demon Kingdom. However, due to being demi-human, she is considered an outcast to others, regardless of her highest magic quality to take the throne. One day, she survived an assassination attempt and escape with her Null magic: Teleport. After being rescued by Touya and regenerating her lost limbs, she suffered amnesia and was named 'Sakura' by Touya for her pink hair. Her real name is Farnese Forneus. Prior to the series, she was bestowed with Phantom of Eyes which altered her face and changed her hair color, with sharp hearing ability. Currently, she stays with Touya at Brunhild Dukedom. She becomes Touya's ninth fiancée.

Babylon

A 5000-year old terminal gynoid, who received a task from Dr. Regina Babylon to manage the Sky Garden of Babylon. Additionally, she works as a maid at Brunhild Dukedom. She is Touya's personal maid after the contract was sealed with a kiss. Her personality is described as perverted and shameless when she does something lewd towards Touya at any opportunity she gets.

Media

Light novels

The series began publication as a web novel, being serialized on the Shōsetsuka ni Narō website since April 8, 2013. The series was later published as a light novel series by Hobby Japan's "HJ Novels" label beginning on May 22, 2015; twenty-seven volumes have been published as of October 19, 2022. The light novel features illustrations by Eiji Usatsuka. It was licensed for digital distribution in the English language by J-Novel Club. J-Novel Club announced at Anime Expo on July 5, 2018 that the series would be the first it would publish in print outside its deal with Seven Seas Entertainment. The novels is published in a partnership with Ingram Publisher Services.

Manga

A manga adaptation by Soto began serialization in the January 2017 issue of Comp Ace (published November 2016), with the first two compiled tankōbon volumes released consecutively in June and July 2017 and the third volume in February 2018. Yen Press announced during its panel at the New York Comic Con Metaverse digital event in October 2020 that it had licensed the manga.

Anime

An anime television series adaptation directed by Takeyuki Yanase, written by Natsuko Takahashi, and animated by Production Reed was announced and aired from July 11 to September 26, 2017. AŌP performed the opening theme song "Another World" while Maaya Uchida, Yui Fukuo, Chinatsu Akatsuki, Marika Kouno, Nanami Yamashita, and Sumire Uesaka. performed different versions of the ending theme song . Crunchyroll streamed and licensed the series, while Funimation produced an English dub and released it on home video as part of the two companies' partnership. Funimation released the series for home video in the British Isles, and in Australia and New Zealand, through their distributors at Sony Pictures UK and Universal Sony respectively.

A second season was announced on April 15, 2022. The second season will be animated by J.C.Staff and directed by Yoshiaki Iwasaki, with Deko Akao handling series composition, Chinatsu Kameyama designing the characters and serving as chief animation director, and Kei Yoshikawa and Kōhei Yamada composing the music. The cast will reprise their roles from the first season and the drama CD. It will premiere on April 3, 2023. Gemstone7 will perform the opening theme song .

Reception
The series has seen considerable popularity on the Shōsetsuka ni Narō website, having been viewed over 100,000,000 times in total.

References

External links
  at Shōsetsuka ni Narō 
  
  
 IseSuma on Twitter 
 

2017 anime television series debuts
2015 Japanese novels
Anime and manga based on light novels
Ashi Productions
Crunchyroll anime
Funimation
Fiction about God
Harem anime and manga
Isekai anime and manga
Isekai novels and light novels
J.C.Staff
J-Novel Club books
Kadokawa Shoten manga
Light novels
Light novels first published online
Monarchy in fiction
Novels about the afterlife
Novels about magic
Seinen manga
Shōsetsuka ni Narō
Tokyo MX original programming
Upcoming anime television series
Works about mobile phones
Yen Press titles